Garfield is an upcoming American computer-animated comedy film based on the Jim Davis comic strip of the same name, produced by Columbia Pictures in association with Alcon Entertainment (in their first animated film), animated by DNEG Animation, and distributed by Sony Pictures Releasing. Directed by Mark Dindal from a screenplay written by David Reynolds, the film stars Chris Pratt as the voice of the titular character, alongside the voices of Samuel L. Jackson, Nicholas Hoult, Cecily Strong, Hannah Waddingham, Brett Goldstein, Bowen Yang, and Ving Rhames.

Development on a new CG animated Garfield film began in May 2016. Dindal was announced to be directing the film in November 2018, with production beginning in the following month. Despite Viacom acquiring the rights to Garfield in August 2019, the project was still in production, according to Dindal in December 2020. In November 2021, Sony Pictures purchased the distribution rights for the film, outside of China, and Pratt was cast as Garfield, while the animation would be provided by DNEG.

Garfield will be theatrically released in the United States on May 24, 2024.

Voice cast
 Chris Pratt as Garfield, a cynical and lazy orange tabby cat who loves lasagna and hates Mondays. 
 Samuel L. Jackson as Vic, Garfield's father
 Nicholas Hoult 
 Ving Rhames
 Cecily Strong
 Hannah Waddingham
 Brett Goldstein
 Bowen Yang

Production
On May 24, 2016, it was announced that Alcon Entertainment would develop a new CG animated Garfield film, with John Cohen and Steven P. Wegner producing, from a script by Mark Torgove and Paul A. Kaplan. Mark Dindal was announced as director on November 12, 2018, with pre-production beginning the following month. In August 2019, Viacom acquired the rights to Garfield, leaving the status of the movie at the time uncertain. However, in December 2020, Dindal confirmed that the film was still in production. On November 1, 2021, Chris Pratt was announced as the voice of Garfield, with animation provided by DNEG Animation, a visual effects and animation studio who previously worked on the animated feature Ron's Gone Wrong. DNEG Animation will produce the film with Alcon, and Sony Pictures will maintain global distribution rights for the film, except for China. It was also announced that Finding Nemo screenwriter David Reynolds will instead write the script. Dindal and Reynolds previously worked together on the Disney animated film The Emperor's New Groove. Voice actor Frank Welker, who has been voicing Garfield since 2007, expressed his disappointment on not being contacted to voice the character.

In May 2022, Samuel L. Jackson joined the film as Garfield's father, Vic. In August 2022, Ving Rhames, Nicholas Hoult, Hannah Waddingham and Cecily Strong were added to the cast. In November 2022, Brett Goldstein and Bowen Yang were added to the cast.

Release
Garfield is scheduled for theatrical release in the United States on May 24, 2024. It was previously scheduled for release on February 16, 2024.

References

External links
 

Upcoming films
2024 films
2024 computer-animated films
American children's animated comedy films
American computer-animated films
Columbia Pictures animated films
Columbia Pictures films
Alcon Entertainment films
Upcoming English-language films
Films about cats
Films directed by Mark Dindal
Garfield films
Animated films based on animated series
Animated films based on comics
Reboot films
2020s American films